Myatt Township is an inactive township in Howell County, in the U.S. state of Missouri.

Myatt Township takes its name from Myatt Creek.

References

Townships in Missouri
Townships in Howell County, Missouri